The Christian Science Monitor (CSM), commonly known as The Monitor,  is a nonprofit news organization that publishes both daily articles in electronic format and a weekly print edition. It was founded in 1908 as a daily newspaper by Mary Baker Eddy, the founder of the Church of Christ, Scientist. , the print circulation was 75,052. 

While it maintains bureaus and correspondents around the world, the newspaper has been based in Boston since its 1908 founding. Its current global headquarters is at 210 Massachusetts Avenue in Boston's Fenway–Kenmore neighborhood.

According to the organization's website, "the Monitor's global approach is reflected in how Mary Baker Eddy described its object as 'To injure no man, but to bless all mankind.' The aim is to embrace the human family, shedding light with the conviction that understanding the world's problems and possibilities moves us towards solutions." The Christian Science Monitor has won seven Pulitzer Prizes and more than a dozen Overseas Press Club awards to date.

Reporting

Despite its name, The Christian Science Monitor is not a religious-themed paper, and does not promote the doctrine of its patron, the Church of Christ, Scientist. However, at its founder Eddy's request, a religious article has appeared near the end of every issue of The Monitor.

The paper has been known for avoiding sensationalism and producing what The Boston Globe in 2005 called a "distinctive brand of non-hysterical journalism". In 1997, the Washington Report on Middle East Affairs, a publication critical of United States policy in the Middle East, praised The Monitor for its objective and informative coverage of Islam and the Middle East.

During the 27 years while Nelson Mandela was in prison in South Africa after having been convicted of sabotage, among other charges, The Christian Science Monitor was one of the newspapers he was allowed to read. Five months after his release, Mandela visited Boston and stopped by The Monitor offices, telling the staff "The Monitor continues to give me hope and confidence for the world's future" and thanking them for their "unwavering coverage of apartheid". Mandela called The Monitor "one of the more important voices covering events in South Africa".

During the era of McCarthyism, a term first coined by The Monitor, the paper was one of the earliest and most consistent critics of U.S. Senator Joseph McCarthy.

In 2006, Jill Carroll, a freelance reporter for The Monitor, was kidnapped in Baghdad, and released safely after 82 days. Although Carroll was initially a freelancer, the paper worked tirelessly for her release, even hiring her as a staff writer shortly after her abduction to ensure that she had financial benefits. Beginning in August 2006, the Monitor published an account of Carroll's kidnapping and subsequent release, with first-person reporting from Carroll and others involved.

Circulation 
The paper's circulation has ranged widely, from a peak of over 223,000 in 1970, to just under 56,000 shortly before the suspension of the daily print edition in 2009. Partially in response to declining circulation and the struggle to earn a profit, the church's directors and the manager of the Christian Science Publishing Society were purportedly forced to plan cutbacks and closures (later denied), which led in 1989 to the mass protest resignations by its chief editor Kay Fanning (an ASNE president and former editor of the Anchorage Daily News), managing editor David Anable, associate editor David Winder, and several other newsroom staff. Those developments also presaged administrative moves to scale back the print newspaper in favor of expansions into radio, a magazine, shortwave broadcasting, and television. Expenses, however, rapidly outpaced revenues, contradicting predictions by church directors. On the brink of bankruptcy, the board was forced to close the broadcast programs in 1992.

By late 2011, The Monitor was receiving an average of about 22 million hits per month on its website, slightly below the Los Angeles Times. In 2017, the Monitor put up a paywall on its content, and in 2018, there were approximately 10,000 subscriptions to the Monitor Daily email service.

History

20th century
The Monitors was founded in 1908 in part as a response by its founder Mary Baker Eddy to the journalism of her day, which relentlessly covered the sensations and scandals surrounding her new religion with varying accuracy. In addition, Joseph Pulitzer's New York World was consistently critical of Eddy, and this, along with a derogatory article in McClure's, furthered Eddy's decision to found her own media outlet. Eddy also required the inclusion of "Christian Science" in the paper's name, over initial opposition by some of her advisors who thought the religious reference might repel a secular audience.

Eddy also saw a vital need to counteract the fear often spread by media reporting:

Looking over the newspapers of the day, one naturally reflects that it is dangerous to live, so loaded with disease seems the very air. These descriptions carry fears to many minds, to be depicted in some future time upon the body. A periodical of our own will counteract to some extent this public nuisance; for through our paper, at the price at which we shall issue it, we shall be able to reach many homes with healing, purifying thought.

Eddy declared that The Monitors mission should be "to injure no man, but to bless all mankind".

MonitoRadio was a radio service produced by the Church of Christ Scientist between 1984 and 1997. It featured several one-hour news broadcasts a day, as well as top of the hour news bulletins. The service was widely heard on public radio stations throughout the United States. The Monitor later launched an international broadcast over shortwave radio, called the World Service of the Christian Science Monitor. Weekdays were news-led, but weekend schedules were exclusively dedicated to religious programming. That service ceased operations on June 28, 1997.

In 1986, The Monitor started producing a current affairs television series, The Christian Science Monitor Reports, which was distributed via syndication to television stations across the United States. In 1988, the Christian Science Monitor Reports won a Peabody Award for a series of reports on Islamic fundamentalism. That same year, the program was canceled and The Monitor created a daily television program, World Monitor, anchored by former NBC correspondent John Hart, which was initially shown on the Discovery Channel. In 1991, World Monitor moved to the Monitor Channel, a 24-hour news and information channel. The channel launched on May 1, 1991, with programming from its Boston TV station, WQTV. The only religious programming on the channel was a five-minute Christian Science program early each morning. In 1992, after eleven months on the air, the service was shut down amid huge financial losses. Programming from the Monitor Channel was also carried nationally via the WWOR EMI Service, a nationally oriented feed of WWOR-TV, a New Jersey-based television station launched in 1990 due to the SyndEx laws put into place the year prior.

21st century
The print edition continued to struggle for readership, and, in 2004, faced a renewed mandate from the church to earn a profit. Subsequently, The Monitor began relying more on the Internet as an integral part of its business model. The Monitor was one of the first newspapers to put its text online in 1996, and was also one of the first to launch a PDF edition in 2001. It was also an early pioneer of RSS feeds.

In 2005, Richard Bergenheim, a Christian Science practitioner, was named the new editor. Shortly before his death in 2008, Bergenheim was replaced by a veteran Boston Globe editor and former Monitor reporter John Yemma.

In October 2008, citing net losses of $US18.9 million per year versus $US12.5 million in annual revenue, The Monitor announced that it would cease printing daily and instead print weekly editions starting in April 2009.  The last daily print edition was published on March 27, 2009.

The weekly magazine follows on from The Monitor London edition, also a weekly, which launched in 1960 and the weekly World Edition, which replaced the London edition in 1974. Mark Sappenfield became the editor in March 2017.

Notable editors and staff (past and present)

 Willis J. Abbot, editor and author
 Clay Bennett, Pulitzer Prize-winning cartoonist
 Richard Bergenheim, editor
 Erwin Canham, editor and author
 Jill Carroll, reporter, kidnapped for 82 days in 2006
 William Henry Chamberlin, reporter, author
 Grover Clark, China correspondent
 John K. Cooley, longtime contributing editor
 Roscoe Drummond, longtime reporter and editor
 Kay Fanning, editor, first woman to edit an American national newspaper
 John Gould, longtime columnist and author
 Roland R. Harrison, editor
 Joseph C. Harsch, CBE, longtime reporter
 Sir Harold Hobson, longtime drama critic
 John Hughes, Pulitzer Prize winner, editor, author
 Reuben H. Markham, longtime reporter, author
 Luix Overbea, journalist, founding member of National Association of Black Journalists
 Scott Peterson, longtime reporter and author
 Cora Rigby, first woman at a major paper to head a Washington, D.C. news bureau and Women's National Press Club co-founder
 David S. Rohde, Pulitzer Prize winner
 Richard Strout, Pulitzer Prize winner
 Nate White, Gerald Loeb Newspaper Award winner
 Colin Woodard, correspondent
 Paul Wohl, political commentator

Awards 
Staff of The Monitor have been recipients of seven Pulitzer Prizes for their work on The Monitor:

 1950, Pulitzer Prize for International Reporting: Edmund Stevens, for his series of 43 articles written over a three-year residence in Moscow entitled, "This Is Russia Uncensored".
 1967, Pulitzer Prize for International Reporting: R. John Hughes, For his thorough reporting of Indonesia's attempted Transition to the New Order in 1965 and the purge that followed in 1965–66.
 1968, Pulitzer Prize for National Reporting: Howard James, for his series of articles, Crisis in the Courts.
 1969, Pulitzer Prize for National Reporting: Robert Cahn, for his inquiry into the future of the United States' national parks and the methods that may help to preserve them.
 1978, Pulitzer Prize Special Citations and Awards, Journalism: Richard Strout, for distinguished commentary from Washington, D.C. over many years as staff correspondent for The Christian Science Monitor and as a contributor to The New Republic.
 1996, Pulitzer Prize for International Reporting: David Rohde, for his persistent on-site reporting of the slaughter of thousands of Bosnian Muslims in the Srebrenica genocide.
 2002, Pulitzer Prize for Editorial Cartooning: Clay Bennett

References

Further reading 
 Canham, Erwin D. (1958). Commitment to Freedom: The Story of the Christian Science Monitor. Boston, MA: Houghton Mifflin Company.
 Merrill, John C. and Fisher, Harold A. (1980). The world's great dailies: profiles of fifty newspapers. Hastings House. pp. 96–103.
 Christian Science Publishing Society (1988). The First 80 Years: The Christian Science Monitor. Boston, MA: CSPS.
 Bridge, Susan (1998). Monitoring the News: The Brilliant Launch and Sudden Collapse of the Monitor Channel. Armonk, New York: M.E. Sharpe.
 Strout, Lawrence N. (1999). Covering McCarthyism: how the 'Christian Science Monitor' handled Joseph R. McCarthy, 1950-1954. Westport, CT: Greenwood Press.
 Fuller, Linda K. (2011). The Christian Science Monitor: An Evolving Experiment in Journalism. Santa Barbara, CA: Praeger.
 Collins, Keith S. (2012). The Christian Science Monitor: Its History, Mission, and People. Nebbadoon Press.

External links

Official website

1908 establishments in Massachusetts
Christian newspapers
Christian Science
Christian Science in Massachusetts
International newspapers
National newspapers published in the United States
Newspapers published in Boston
Newspapers established in 1908
Online newspapers with defunct print editions
Pulitzer Prize-winning newspapers
Weekly newspapers published in the United States